Tvishi Hydro Power Plant will be a large power plant in Tsageri Municipality, Racha-Lechkhumi and Kvemo Svaneti, Georgia two has two turbines with a nominal capacity of 55 MW each having a total capacity of 110 MW.

See also

 List of power stations in Georgia (country)
 Energy in Georgia (country)

References

Hydroelectric power stations in Georgia (country)
Proposed hydroelectric power stations
Proposed renewable energy power stations in Georgia (country)